Saint Thalelæus (or Thalilaeus Epiklautos, ; died ) was a 5th-century Syrian hermit known for continuous weeping. His feast day is 27 February.

Life

Saint Thalelæus was born in Cilicia in Asia Minor.
He was ordained as a presbyter in the monastery of Saint Sabbas the Sanctified.
He later moved to a graveyard beside a run-down pagan temple in Syria near Habala, where he lived in a tent.
Travellers passing by were afraid of the unclean spirits that haunted the place.
The monk lived alone, praying day and night, and eventually drove away the demons.
He built himself a tiny cramped hut where he lived for another ten years.
Through his example and miracles he made many converts, who built a church in place of the pagan temple.
He died about 460.

Monks of Ramsgate account

The monks of St Augustine's Abbey, Ramsgate wrote in their Book of Saints (1921),

Hone's account

William Hone in his Every Day Book, Or, A Guide to the Year wrote, under February 27,

Butler's account

The hagiographer Alban Butler (1710–1773) wrote in his Lives of the Fathers, Martyrs, and Other Principal Saints under February 27,

Baring-Gould's account

Sabine Baring-Gould (1834–1924) in his The Lives Of The Saints wrote under February 27,

Notes

Citations

Sources

 
 

 

Syrian Christian saints
460 deaths